Charka may refer to:

 Charka, Jangipur, a census town in India
 An  obsolete unit of liquid measure in Russia
 Satya Narayana Charka, American dancer

See also
 Charkha (disambiguation)
 Charkas, a village in  Kermanshah Province, Iran
Charla (name)